The 1964 Espirito Santo Trophy took place 1–4 October at Golf de Saint Germain in Saint-Germain-en-Laye, west of Paris, France. It was the first women's golf World Amateur Team Championship for the Espirito Santo Trophy. The tournament was a 72-hole stroke play team event with 25 three-woman teams. The best two scores for each round counted towards the team total.

France won the Trophy, beating United States by one stroke. United States took the silver medal while England, a further nine strokes behind, took the bronze.

Teams 
25 teams contested the event. Each team had three players.

Results

Sources:

Individual leaders 
There was no official recognition for the lowest individual scores.

References

External links 
World Amateur Team Championships on International Golf Federation website

Espirito Santo Trophy
Golf tournaments in France
Espirito Santo Trophy
Espirito Santo Trophy
Espirito Santo Trophy